Ai Liya (born 1 December 1965 in Inner Mongolia) is a Chinese film and television actress. She graduated from the Acting Department of Beijing Film Academy in 1985.

Filmography

Awards and nominations

References

External links
 

1965 births
Living people
Chinese film actresses
20th-century Chinese actresses
21st-century Chinese actresses
Chinese television actresses
Actresses from Inner Mongolia
Chinese people of Mongolian descent